The presidial courts (singular ) were judicial courts of the Kingdom of France set up in January 1551 by Henry II of France with jurisdiction between the parlements and the bailiwicks. They were suppressed by a decree of the National Constituent Assembly in 1790.

References

Legal history of the Ancien Régime